is a train station on the Tenryū Hamanako Line in Kakegawa, Shizuoka Prefecture, Japan. It is located 1.3 rail kilometers from the terminus of the line at Kakegawa Station.

Station History
Kakegawa-shiyakusho-mae Station was established on March 18, 1996 as a commuter station after the relocation of Kakegawa city hall to a nearby location. The station is also located in close proximity to a number of large factories.

Lines
Tenryū Hamanako Railroad
Tenryū Hamanako Line

Layout
Kakegawa-shiyakusho-mae Station is an unmanned station with a single, elevated side platform.

Adjacent stations

|-
!colspan=5|Tenryū Hamanako Railroad

External links
   Tenryū Hamanako Railroad Station information	

Railway stations in Shizuoka Prefecture
Railway stations in Japan opened in 1996
Stations of Tenryū Hamanako Railroad